Sobreviviré (English: I Will Survive) is a 1999 comedy-drama romantic comedy directed by Alfonso Albacete and David Menkes, starring Emma Suárez and Juan Diego Botto, playing a straight woman and a gay man who fall in love. The film and especially the soundtrack was very successful in Spain. Paz Vega has a small role as an airline hostess. Writer and co-script writer Lucía Etxebarría has a cameo as herself in a Chueca café.

Plot
Marga (Emma Suárez), a pregnant and widowed woman, is going through a streak of bad luck. Via her friendship with Rosa (Marta Ibarra), she begins to rebuild her confidence, but faces difficulties. After beginning a relationship with Iñaqui (Juan Diego Botto), an attractive gay sculptor who is ten years younger than her, her life begins to improve. Initially friends, they develop a sexual relationship, something they both thought impossible because Iñaqui is gay.

Cast 
 Emma Suárez as Marga
 Juan Diego Botto as Iñaqui
 Marta Ibarra as Rosa
 Rosana Pastor as Trini
 Manuel Manquiña as Rolando
 Àlex Brendemühl as José
 Adrià Collado as Roberto

References

External links

1999 films
1999 romantic comedy-drama films
Spanish romantic comedy-drama films
Gay-related films
Male bisexuality in film
1990s Spanish-language films
Madrid in fiction
Spain in fiction
Spanish LGBT-related films
Films directed by Alfonso Albacete
1999 comedy films
1999 drama films
1990s Spanish films
LGBT-related romantic comedy-drama films